Liam Nevin is an Irish writer who was born in 1951 and grew up in Maynooth, Co. Kildare, the second youngest of eight children. He moved to London in 1972 where he now lives and works.

The Tobacco Fields of Meath
While researching a family tree, Nevin came across papers detailing the growing of tobacco at Randlestown House outside Navan Co. Meath, which was the family seat of Sir Nugent Everard. Nevin compiled the documents to produce The Tobacco Fields of Meath which details the difficulties and challenges faced by Sir Nugent and the estate's under-steward, Liam's grandfather John Nevin, in their tobacco experiment. The book also mentions the history of tobacco-growing in Ireland and country life in the early 20th century.

Brightening Over Dillon's: Memories of days gone by
Liam's second book was published in September 2016 and is a fictionalised version of childhood in rural Ireland in the 1960s.

Publications
The Tobacco Fields of Meath, 2012. .
Brightening Over Dillon's: Memories of days gone by, 2016.

References

External links
 Liam Nevin at The Manuscript Publisher website

1951 births
Living people
Historians
Historians